is a traditional style of comedy in Japanese culture comparable to double act comedy or stand-up comedy.

 usually involves two performers—a straight man and a funny man—trading jokes at great speed. Most of the jokes revolve around mutual misunderstandings, double-talk, puns and other verbal gags.

In recent times,  has often been associated with the Osaka region, and  comedians often speak in the Kansai dialect during their acts. 

In 2015, Matayoshi Naoki's manzai novel, won the Akutagawa Prize. A mini-series adaptation was released on Netflix in 2016.

History
Originally based around a festival to welcome the New Year,  traces its origins back to the Heian period. The two  performers came with messages from the gods and this was worked into a standup routine, with one performer showing some sort of opposition to the word of the other.

With the arrival of the Meiji period,  began to implement changes that would see it surpass in popularity the styles of the former period, although at the time  was still considered the more popular form of entertainment.

With the end of the Taishō period, Yoshimoto Kōgyō—which itself was founded at the beginning of the era, in 1912—introduced a new style of  lacking much of the celebration that had accompanied it in the past. This new style proved successful and spread all over Japan, including Tokyo. Riding on the waves of new communication technology,  quickly spread through the mediums of stage, radio, and eventually, television, and video games.

Etymology
The kanji for  have been written in various ways throughout the ages.

and 
Similar in execution to the concepts of "funny man" and "straight man" in double act comedy (e.g. The word  refers to the role the second comedian plays in "butting in" and correcting the 's errors. A Japanese bamboo and paper umbrella is another common prop. These props are usually used only during non-serious  routines as traditional  requires there to be no props in terms of routine and in competitions. The use of props would put the comedy act closer to a conte rather than manzai.

Notable  acts
Downtown
Cocorico
Takeshi Kitano; Japanese film director, television host, and former  performer in the group "Two Beat".  is mentioned and referenced in a number of his other works.

Literary associations
Kikaku wrote with affectionate mockery a haiku on the  dancers: "The New Year Dancers / Never miss a single gate – / Millet for the crane".
Buson more positively wrote: "Yes, New Year's dancers – / Pounding good and properly, / The dirt in Kyoto".

See also

References

External links

 What is Manzai 2015 archive
 "Commodified Comedians and Mediatized Manzai: Osakan Comic Duos and Their Audience" by Xavier Benjamin Bensky. A study in the cultural effects of manzai.

 
Comedy genres
Culture in Osaka
Japanese comedy
Performing arts in Japan
Stand-up comedy